Calvin Fish (born 22 July 1961 in Norwich) is a British  television commentator for NBC Sports and a former racing driver.

Fish began his career in karts at 13. He then moved to Formula Ford in 1979 at age 18 and then British Formula Three. He then came to the United States and competed in various classes of SCCA competition as well as IMSA GT. He was the 1987 Formula Atlantic champion and then made 14 starts in the Indy Lights series. He returned to sports cars. He was the GTO class winner at the 12 Hours of Sebring and 24 Hours of Daytona in 1990.

He is currently an analyst and commentator for NBC Sports on IMSA broadcasts, and for CBS Sports Network on GT World Challenge America broadcasts.

External links
Speed Channel bio

1961 births
English racing drivers
British Formula Three Championship drivers
Indy Lights drivers
Atlantic Championship drivers
Motorsport announcers
Sportspeople from Norwich
Living people

David Price Racing drivers
24 Hours of Daytona drivers
Rocketsports Racing drivers